Arye Gross (born March 17, 1960) is an American actor, who has appeared on a variety of television shows in numerous roles, most notably Adam Greene in the ABC sitcom Ellen.

Personal life 
Gross was born on March 17, 1960, in Los Angeles, California, the son of Sheri and Joseph Gross, who was an aerospace engineer and later worked in business.

He and Lisa Schulz married in 1999 and have one daughter born in 2006.

Education and training 
Gross attended public school and in 1977 was accepted to the University of California Irvine to study theater. Robert Cohen, then head of UCI's Drama Department later said, "I remember him as an undergrad student actor and knew he was quite good." The following summer he was accepted in the Professional Conservatory program at South Coast Repertory (SCR) in neighboring Costa Mesa, where Lee Shallat-Chemel was then the program director. She remembered how he handled Edgar's "nonsensical" passages in King Lear during scene study. "Arye found a visceral reality and the scene became filled with pathos and meaning. And it just blew me away. I had never seen, really, any actor do that."

Career

Stage
Gross was part of SCR's acting company for three years, which culminated in his role in the world premiere of L.J. Schneiderman's Screwball. Director Frank Condon invited Gross to work with Teatro Campesino under the direction of Luis Valdez, which he did for a year.

Gross appeared in a number of stage productions with a variety of companies in the Los Angeles area, including LATC, Pasadena Playhouse, Odyssey Theater Ensemble, MET Theater and Stages Theater Center. Gross' stage credits include La Bete for the Stages Theatre Center, Room Service for the Pasadena Playhouse, Three Sisters for the Los Angeles Theatre Center, Taming of the Shrew and Much Ado About Nothing for the Grove Shakespeare Festival, Troillus and Cressida for the Globe Playhouse. He performed in Georges Feydeau's Sleep, I Want You to Sleep at the Stages Theatre Company, where he served as Managing Director.

He is a member of the Antaeus Theatre Company, where he appeared in Mrs. Warren's Profession and as the title character in Uncle Vanya. His South Coast Repertory credits also include the world premieres of Richard Greenberg's Our Mother's Brief Affair, and Donald Margulies' Brooklyn Boy, which marked Gross' Broadway debut when it moved to New York. He also was in the 2016 world premiere of Eliza Clark's Future Thinking.

Television
Gross's best-known television role was on the ABC series Ellen as Adam Green for the program's first three seasons.  Gross also starred in the short-lived series Citizen Baines with James Cromwell. Arye has made numerous guest appearances on a wide variety of television series, such as Diff'rent Strokes, Knight Rider, The Outer Limits, Six Feet Under, Law & Order: Special Victims Unit, Diagnosis: Murder, Friends and Law & Order: Criminal Intent. He also had a recurring role as Dr. Sidney Perlmutter on Castle.

Gross also played the adult voice of Kevin Arnold on the pilot episode of The Wonder Years when it first aired after Super Bowl XXII. However, the narration was re-recorded using Daniel Stern's voice for the pilot when it subsequently re-aired, and Stern remained the narrator through the entire run of the series.

Directing
In 1999, Gross acted in and directed The Prince and the Surfer, his film directorial debut.

Filmography

Film

Television

References

External links

1960 births
American male film actors
American male television actors
Male actors from Los Angeles
Living people